4-Methoxybutyrfentanyl (also known as 4-MeO-BF) is an opioid analgesic that is an analog of butyrfentanyl and has been sold online as a designer drug.

Side effects 

Side effects of fentanyl analogs are similar to those of fentanyl itself, which include itching, nausea and potentially serious respiratory depression, which can be life-threatening. Fentanyl analogs have killed hundreds of people throughout Europe and the former Soviet republics since the most recent resurgence in use began in Estonia in the early 2000s, and novel derivatives continue to appear.

Life-threatening adverse reactions have been observed.

Legal status 

4-Methoxybutyrfentanyl is illegal in Sweden as of 26. January 2016.

4-Methoxybutyrfentanyl is a Schedule I controlled drug in the USA since 1. February 2018.

See also 
 3-Methylbutyrfentanyl
 3-Methylfentanyl
 4-Fluorobutyrfentanyl
 α-Methylfentanyl
 Acetylfentanyl
 Furanylfentanyl
 List of fentanyl analogues

References 

Anilides
Designer drugs
Mu-opioid receptor agonists
Phenol ethers
Piperidines
Propionamides
Synthetic opioids